The 1972–73 National Hurling League was the 42nd season of the National Hurling League.

Division 1

Cork came into the season as defending champions of the 1971-72 season.

On 13 May 1973, Wexford won the title following a 4-13 to 3-7 win over Limerick in the final. It was their fourth league title overall and their first since 1966-67.

Tipperary's Francis Loughnane was the Division 1 top scorer with 5-55.

Division 1A table

Group stage

Division 1B table

Group stage

Knock-out stage

Quarter-finals

Semi-finals

Final

Scoring statistics

Top scorers overall

Top scorers in a single game

References

National Hurling League seasons
League
League